Anisa Anwar Ali (born 28 August 2000) is an Indian professional footballer who plays as a defender for Indian Super League club Goa and the India national team.

Early life 
Born in Adampur, Punjab, Ali started to play football at the age of seven in a local club. Started as a striker, later shifted to defensive line.

Club career

Minerva Punjab 
Ali joined the youth set-up of Minerva Punjab in 2015 and played for the club in different youth level completions including the Elite League. His performance at the club earned him national call-ups.

Indian Arrows (loan) 
After an impressive 2017 FIFA U-17 World Cup campaign, Ali joined Indian Arrows on a season-long loan from Minerva Punjab ahead of the 2017–18 I-League. He made his professional debut in a 3–0 home win over Chennai City.

Mumbai City 
On 7 August 2018, Ali joined Indian Super League club Mumbai City on a three-year deal. He was loaned out to Indian Arrows ahead of the 2018–19 I-League. He was named in Mumbai City squad for the 2019–20 Indian Super League season, but later withdrawn after diagnosed with a rare heart condition.

Mohammedan SC 
On 24 August 2020, Ali joined Mohammedan for their 2020 I-League Qualifiers, but the AIFF directed the club no not allow him to train with the team citing his heart condition. Mohammedan chose to release him considering directions from the top football body, despite of a verdict from the Delhi High Court which allowed him to join the team.

Techtro Swades United 
On 23 November 2020, Ali joined Techtro Swades United of Himachal Football League in a short-term contract. He appeared twice for the club in the league.

Delhi FC 
On 21 May 2021, Ali joined Delhi FC on five-year deal. After being allowed by the AIFF to return to competitive football, he featured in the 2021 Durand Cup and helped Delhi to reach knockout stage. He became the top scorer of 2021 I-League Qualifiers after scoring four goals from seven appearances.

FC Goa 
On 1 January 2022, Ali joined Indian Super League club FC Goa on an eighteen-month loan from Delhi FC He made his debut in a 1–0 home win over Chennaiyin.

International career

Youth 
In 2015, Ali was called up for the 2017 FIFA U-17 World Cup preparatory squad of India under-17, after head coach Luís Norton de Matos impressed with his defensive display for Minerva Punjab youth side against India u-17 in a practice match. Two successful years with the national side saw him in the final 21-member squad for the U-17 World Cup which was hosted in India He started in all of India's group stage matches.

He scored the winner in India under-20s historical 2–1 win against Argentina u-20s in the 2018 COTIF Tournament.

Senior 
In May 2019, Ali was called up for India senior team national camp, but later sent back after being diagnosed with a rare heart condition. In March 2022, Ali was called up for the India national football team|national football squad by coach Igor Štimac ahead of India's two friendly matches against Bahrain and Belarus. He made his debut on 23 March against Bahrain in their 2–1 defeat, and scored his first international goal on 14 June against Hong Kong in their 4–0 win at the 2023 AFC Asian Cup qualification.

Personal life 
In 2019, Anwar Ali was forbidden from playing football by the AIFF as he was diagnosed with a rare heart disease namely Hypertrophic cardiomyopathy, where the heart muscle wall becomes abnormally thick and affects the pumping of blood. Later, Ali got a verdict from the Delhi High Court which allowed him to play.

Career statistics

Club

International

International goals
Scores and results list India's goal tally first

References

External links 

Anwar Ali at Indian Super League

2000 births
Living people
People from Jalandhar district
Indian footballers
India international footballers
FC Goa players
RoundGlass Punjab FC players
Indian Arrows players
Association football goalkeepers
Footballers from Punjab, India
I-League players
India youth international footballers